Carinodrillia dariena is a species of sea snail, a marine gastropod mollusk in the family Pseudomelatomidae.

Description
The length of the shell attains 34.7 mm, its diameter 10.4 mm.

Distribution
This marine species occurs in the Bay of Panama.

References

 Olsson, Axel A. "Biological Results of the University of Miami Deep-Sea Expeditions. 77. Mollusks from the Gulf of Panama Collected by R/V John Elliott Pillsbury, 1967." Bulletin of Marine Science 21.1 (1971): 35–92
 Keen, A. M. 1971. Sea Shells of Tropical West America. Marine mollusks from Baja California to Peru, ed. 2. Stanford University Press. xv, 1064 pp., 22 pls.

External links
 
 

dariena
Gastropods described in 1971